The Royal Cornwall Museum in Truro holds an extensive mineral collection rooted in Cornwall's mining and engineering heritage (including much of the mineral collection of Philip Rashleigh). The county's artistic heritage is reflected in the museum's art collection. Through the Courtney Library the museum also provides a collection of rare books and manuscripts to help with education, research and the discovery of Cornish life and culture.

The museum also highlights Cornwall's relationship with the wider world through one of the most significant British emigrations of the 19th century. The museum hosts a permanent exhibition of ancient Egyptian, Greek, and Roman objects, supported by the British Museum.

The museum is part of the Royal Institution of Cornwall (RIC), a learned society and registered charity.

The Courtney Library

The Courtney Library and Archive holds books, periodicals, archive material and ephemera relating to Cornwall and the South West of England.

Museum building

The Grade II building which has housed the RIC since 1919 was built in 1845 as the Truro Savings Bank and subsequently became Henderson's Mining School. In 1986/7 the RIC acquired the adjacent Truro Baptist Chapel, built in 1848. Together these granite-fronted buildings (linked with a new foyer and shop in 1998) are a distinctive presence in the centre of the historic city of Truro; both buildings were designed by the local architect Philip Sambell, who was deaf and without speech.

History

In July 2022 Cornwall Council announced plans to cease funding the museum. This resulted in the museum stating that it might soon have to close. In October 2022 the Council provided the museum with £100,000 with the stated aim that it would allow the museum to transition to other funding sources.

Collection

The museum is home to the Trewinnard Coach which dates to around 1700.The Artognou stone found at Tintagel Castle is also at the museum.

Rail access
The nearest railway station is Truro railway station.

See also
Kehillat Kernow

References

External links

 
 Information from the 24 Hour Museum

Cornish culture
Museums in Cornwall
Art museums and galleries in Cornwall
Archaeological museums in England
History museums in Cornwall
Natural history museums in England
Geology museums in England
Decorative arts museums in England
Egyptological collections in England
Truro
Local museums in Cornwall
Organisations based in Cornwall with royal patronage
Museums established in 1818
1818 establishments in England